Turenne is a railway station in Turenne, Nouvelle-Aquitaine, France. The station is located on the Brive-Toulouse (via Capdenac) line. The station is served by TER (local) services operated by SNCF.

Train services
The following services currently call at Turenne:
local service (TER Auvergne-Rhône-Alpes) Brive-la-Gaillarde - Aurillac
local service (TER Occitanie) Brive-la-Gaillarde - Figeac - Rodez

References

Railway stations in Corrèze